Curtis Earl McDonald (born 24 March 1988) is a Welsh footballer who plays as a left-sided defender or midfielder. He is currently playing for Barry Town United.

Club career
Born in Cardiff, Curtis made his debut for Cardiff City on 30 April 2006 against Coventry City in the Football League Championship. On 24 November, he joined Accrington Stanley on loan, making one appearance during a 2–0 defeat to Doncaster Rovers in the Football League Trophy as a substitute replacing Andy Todd. He returned to the Bluebirds, coming off the bench to score two goals, including the winner, on his Cardiff City debut, away at Carmarthen Town in the FAW Premier Cup but, at the end of the 2006–07 season he was released by Cardiff.

After a few months playing for Welsh Premier League side Carmarthen Town, he moved to Poland, joining MKS Swit, alongside fellow Welshman Gianluca Palladino, in an arrangement with M&M sports management. He stated that his aim was to return to England during the November break in Poland and earn a deal at a Football League club.

He eventually returned to Britain and signed a 6-month deal at Forest Green Rovers, linking up with former Cardiff teammate Stuart Fleetwood. He made his debut in a 1–1 draw with Kettering Town on 9 August 2008 and stayed on for the 2008–09 campaign at The New Lawn on non-contract terms and signed on for the following season when again offered a contract to stay.

McDonald left the club at the end of the 2009–10 season and trialled with Football League sides, Stockport County and Leyton Orient, however he did not earn a contract and re-joined Forest Green. He celebrated his return by scoring the third goal in a 4–3 victory for Rovers against Hayes & Yeading United.

On 28 December 2010, he signed for fellow Conference National side Newport County. His spell with Newport was disappointing however and in March 2011 McDonald re-signed for Forest Green on loan. This move was made permanent on 31 May 2011 when he signed a one-year contract with the Nailsworth club.

A lengthy injury lay off saw McDonald miss the majority of the 2011–12 season. After returning to fitness, McDonald was loaned out to Brackley Town and made his debut on 7 April 2012 against Hemel Hempstead Town. McDonald went on to become part of the Brackley team that were crowned Southern Premier Division champions as a draw with Oxford City on 21 April 2012 was enough to earn the club promotion. At the end of the season McDonald was released by Forest Green and he joined Brackley on a permanent basis.

In July 2016, McDonald signed for Southern League side Merthyr Town.

In 2017, McDonald signed for newly promoted Chippenham Town in the National League South

International career
Curtis has played three times for the Wales under-21 team. He has also played at under-19 and under-17 level.

In November 2009, McDonald made his debut for the Wales semi-professional side in a 2–2 draw with Northern Ireland.

References

External links

Welsh Premier profile

1988 births
Living people
Footballers from Cardiff
Wales youth international footballers
Wales under-21 international footballers
Wales semi-pro international footballers
Cardiff City F.C. players
Accrington Stanley F.C. players
Carmarthen Town A.F.C. players
Forest Green Rovers F.C. players
Newport County A.F.C. players
Brackley Town F.C. players
English Football League players
Expatriate footballers in Poland
National League (English football) players
Cymru Premier players
Association football defenders
Welsh footballers
Welsh expatriate footballers
Welsh expatriate sportspeople in Poland
Barry Town United F.C. players
Chippenham Town F.C. players